Bobby I Love You, Purrr is a reality television LGBT dating show, starring Love & Hip Hop: Miamis Bobby Lytes and viral video personality Rolling Ray. Lytes and Ray serve as the show's executive producers, along with Love & Hip Hop: Hollywoods Jason Lee. The show premiered on August 21, 2022 on Zeus Network.

Development
Bobby Nico Wade, known professionally as Bobby Lytes, is a rapper and the openly gay cousin of Trina. He first came into prominence as a cast member of Love & Hip Hop: Miami. Wheelchair user, Raymond Harper, nicknamed "Rolling Ray", first garnered attention online for his appearances on the Catfish spin-off Catfish: Trolls and Divorce Court.

Ray and Lytes feuded online, leading to a confrontation which aired as a two-part episode of The Conversation on November 7 and November 14, 2021. On May 17, 2022, Zeus Network announced that the two would reunite for a dating show, in which Ray would help Lytes find love.

Contestants 
15 men compete for Bobby's affections, most notably professional basketball player Grandy Glaze, Bahamian track-and-field athlete Jameson Strachan and André Marhold, professional basketball player and ex-boyfriend of Jeffree Star.

Call-out order 

Note:

Episodes

References

External links
 

2020s American reality television series
2022 American television series debuts
English-language television shows
Television shows set in Miami
African-American reality television series
American LGBT-related reality television series
American dating and relationship reality television series
2020s American LGBT-related television series